Um Ji-Eun (born 18 May 1987, in Incheon) is a South Korean freestyle wrestler. She competed in the freestyle 55 kg event at the 2012 Summer Olympics and was eliminated in the qualifications by Marwa Amri.

References

External links
 

1987 births
Living people
South Korean female sport wrestlers
Olympic wrestlers of South Korea
Wrestlers at the 2012 Summer Olympics
Wrestlers at the 2010 Asian Games
Wrestlers at the 2014 Asian Games
Sportspeople from Incheon
Wrestlers at the 2018 Asian Games
Asian Games competitors for South Korea
20th-century South Korean women
21st-century South Korean women